The Cuba national baseball team (Spanish: Selección de béisbol de Cuba) represents Cuba at regional and international levels. The team is made up from the most professional players from the Cuban national baseball system. Cuba has been described as a baseball powerhouse and currently ranks 8th in WBSC's world rankings. It has medalled in all five Olympics in which baseball was played. Cuba played in the 2017 World Baseball Classic. The team tried but failed to qualify for the 2020 Olympics at the eight-team Americas Qualifying Event on May 31 through June 5, 2021.

Current squad

Results and fixtures

The following is a list of professional baseball match results currently active in the latest version of the WBSC World Rankings, as well as any future matches that have been scheduled.

Legend

2019

2021

2022

2023

World Baseball Classic, Olympics, and IBAF World Cup history

2006 WBC

Cuba competed in the inaugural 2006 World Baseball Classic (WBC) tournament, despite the controversy of Cuban involvement and the United States embargo against Cuba. In the final, Cuba lost the gold medal to Japan, 10–6.

2009 WBC

This was the second time Cuba competed at the 2009 WBC Pool B stage, at Foro Sol in Mexico City. Cuba continued to advance to the second round with wins over South Africa and Australia. Cuba lost to Japan twice in the 2nd round, and were eliminated.

They last were eliminated before the start of the final stage of any international tournament in 1951.

2013 WBC 

This was the third time Cuba competed at the 2013 WBC Pool A stage, in the Fukuoka Dome in Fukuoka, Japan. Cuba advanced in the tournament against: China, Japan, and newcomers Brazil. Cuba moved on to the second round in Pool 1 to defeat the Netherlands, losing 6–2. Cuba defeated Chinese Taipei, 14–0. They played a face off game with previous competitors, the Netherlands, and lost 7–6. Just as in 2009, Cuba was eliminated in the path to competing in the finals.

2017 WBC

At the 2017 World Baseball Classic, Cuban hitters Frederich Cepeda and Alfredo Despaigne had the distinction in WBC history to be the only players that each hit six home runs in their careers in the WBC.

The team had a 2–1 record in the first round. It was led by slugger Despaigne, who took over as the all-time WBC home-run leader.

Cuba advanced into the second round, where it lost its first game to undefeated Pool A winner Team Israel. Former Major League starting pitcher Jason Marquis (in 5.2 innings) and three Team Israel relief pitchers (including Brad Goldberg and Josh Zeid, who both threw 96 mph fastballs) kept Cuba to five hits and one run, a homer by Despaigne, who became the all-time World Baseball Classic home run leader. Pool A MVP catcher Ryan Lavarnway had two hits for Israel. Cuba went on to lose all 3 games they played and failed to advance to the championship round.

Olympics
Cuba has been the most successful Cuba national team at the Olympics bringing home three gold medals and two silver medals. They have the distinction of being one of two nations to compete in the first five baseball contests at the Summer Olympic Games since it has been an event that started at the [[Olympic.

On June 1, 2021, Cuba was eliminated from qualification for the 2020 Olympics, marking their first failure to qualify for the games.

IBAF World Cup

2009 IBAF World Cup
Cuba was originally slated to host the 2009 Baseball World Cup, however, they willingly gave up the honor to Europe. In an effort to help baseball grow as a sport in Europe, the Baseball World Cup was hosted by a whole continent for the first time in history. The  Baseball World Cup took place from September 9–27. Seven European countries hosted and participated in the tournament of 22 teams. The event was made up of five groups consisting of four teams each, for a total of 20 teams. Italy (Bollate, Bologna, Codogno, Florence, Macerata, Milano, Parma, Piacenza, Reggio Emilia, Rimini, San Marino, Torino, Trieste, Verona & Vicenza) and Netherlands (Rotterdam, Haarlem & Amsterdam) served as hosts of the sixteen teams of the second round (September 14–20), and therefore received first round byes. The groups are as follows:

Group A (hosted by the Czech Republic in Prague): Czech Republic, Australia, Chinese Taipei & Mexico
Group B (hosted by Spain in Barcelona): Spain, Cuba, Puerto Rico & South Africa
Group C (hosted by Sweden in Stockholm): Sweden, Canada, Korea & Netherlands Antilles
Group D (hosted by Russia in Moscow): Russia, France/Great Britain, Japan & Nicaragua
Group E (hosted by Germany in Regensburg): Germany, China, U.S.A. & Venezuela

International tournament results

World Baseball Classic

Olympics
Gold: 1992, 1996, 2004
Silver: 2000, 2008

Baseball World Cup
Silver: 1941, 2007, 2009, 2011
Bronze: 1944, 1951

Intercontinental Cup
Gold: 1979, 1983, 1985, 1987, 1989, 1991, 1993, 1995, 2002, 2006
Silver: 1981, 1997, 1999

Pan American Games
Gold: 1951, 1963, 1971, 1975, 1979, 1983, 1987, 1991, 1995, 1999, 2003, 2007
Silver: 1967
Bronze: 2011, 2015

Central American & Caribbean Games
Gold: 1926, 1930, 1935, 1938, 1950, 1966, 1970, 1974, 1978, 1986, 1990, 1993, 1998, 2006, 2014
Silver: 1982, 2018
Bronze: 1946

See also

1999 Baltimore Orioles–Cuba national baseball team exhibition series

References

External links

 
 National
National baseball teams